Ziveh (also Romanized as Zīveh; also known as Qal‘eh-ye Zīveh and Qal‘eh Zeva) is a village in Margavar Rural District, Silvaneh District, Urmia County, West Azerbaijan Province, Iran. At the 2006 census, its population was 987, in 188 families.

References 

Populated places in Urmia County